Durham station may refer to:

Durham station (North Carolina), an Amtrak train station in Durham, North Carolina, USA
Durham railway station, a railway station in Durham, England
Durham–UNH station, an Amtrak station in Durham, New Hampshire, USA
Durham Station, North Carolina, former name of the city of Durham, North Carolina

See also
Durham (disambiguation)